"What You Want", also known as "Tell Me What You Want", is the second single released from Mase's debut album, Harlem World. It was produced by Nashiem Myrick of the production team, The Hitmen and featured vocals by R&B group, Total. The song samples "Right on for the Darkness" by Curtis Mayfield. "What You Want" was another successful single for Mase, peaking at #6 on the  Billboard Hot 100, becoming his second straight top 10 single, and was certified gold by the Recording Industry Association of America (RIAA).

Single track listing

A-Side
"What You Want" (Album Version)- 4:04  
"What You Want" (Instrumental)- 4:38

B-Side
"What You Want" (Remix)- 4:34  
"What You Want" (Remix Instrumental)- 4:34

Charts and certifications

Weekly charts

Year-end charts

Certifications

References

1997 songs
1997 singles
Mase songs
Total (group) songs
Bad Boy Records singles
Songs written by Sean Combs
Songs written by Curtis Mayfield
Songs written by Mase